"Without You" is a song recorded by Australian group Girlfriend. The song was released in September 1992 as the third single from their debut studio album Make It Come True. The song peaked at number 18 on the ARIA Charts.

Track listing

Charts

Weekly charts

Year-end charts

References

1992 songs
1992 singles
Bertelsmann Music Group singles
RCA Records singles
Girlfriend (band) songs
Songs written by Robyn Loau